Henryk Trębicki (22 October 1940 – 8 June 1996) was a Polish bantamweight weightlifter. He competed at the 1964, 1968 and 1972 Olympics and won a bronze medal in 1968, placing fourth in 1964 and 1972. He won a silver medal at the 1971 world and a bronze medal at the 1965 European championships. He also placed third at the 1970 World Championships, but was disqualified after a positive doping test.

References

1940 births
1996 deaths
Polish male weightlifters
Olympic weightlifters of Poland
Olympic bronze medalists for Poland
Weightlifters at the 1964 Summer Olympics
Weightlifters at the 1968 Summer Olympics
Weightlifters at the 1972 Summer Olympics
Olympic medalists in weightlifting
People from Sokółka County
Sportspeople from Podlaskie Voivodeship
Medalists at the 1968 Summer Olympics
20th-century Polish people